Hohenhausen may refer to:

 Hohenhausen, North Rhine-Westphalia, German village
 Carl Ludvig von Hohenhausen (1787–1866), Swedish politician
 Leonhard von Hohenhausen (1788–1872), Acting Bavarian War Minister and General der Kavallerie
 Michael Silvius von Hohenhausen (1790–1849), Swedish politician
 Sylvius Maximilian von Hohenhausen (1738–unknown), Bavarian Major General